The 1967 New Zealand Grand Prix was a race held at the Pukekohe Park Raceway on 7 January 1967.  The race had 19 starters.

It was the 14th New Zealand Grand Prix, and doubled as the opening round of the 1967 Tasman Series.  Jackie Stewart won his only NZGP, becoming the last British driver to win the event until Lando Norris in 2016.

Classification 
Results as follows:

References

New Zealand Grand Prix
Grand Prix
Tasman Series
January 1967 sports events in New Zealand